Joishtho (Jyôishţhô or , Jôishţhyô, colloquially  Jeţh) is the second month and the last month for summer of the Bengali calendar. Its name is derived from the star Jyestha.

References

Months of the Bengali calendar